The 1993 Wake Forest Demon Deacons football team was an American football team that represented Wake Forest University during the 1993 NCAA Division I-A football season. In their first season under head coach Jim Caldwell, the Demon Deacons compiled a 2–9 record and finished in last place in the Atlantic Coast Conference.

Schedule

Team leaders

References

Wake Forest
Wake Forest Demon Deacons football seasons
Wake Forest Demon Deacons football